Jeevana Jyothi or Jeevana Jyoti or Jeevan Jyoti or Jeewan Jyoti is the name of many Indian films:

 Jeevan Jyoti (1937 film), a 1937 Hindi film
 Jeevana Jyothi (1940 film), a 1940 Telugu film
 Jeewan Jyoti (1953 film), a 1953 Hindi film
 Jeevana Jyothi (1975 film), a 1975 Telugu film directed by K. Vishwanath
 Jeevan Jyoti (1976 film), a 1976 Hindi film by A.V.M. Productions
 Jeevana Jyothi (1987 film), a Kannada film
 Jeevana Jyothi (1988 film), a 1988 Telugu film directed by Relangi Narasimha Rao